Kimberly Nicole Dowdell, AIA, originally from Detroit, Michigan, is a Chicago-based architect, real estate developer, and educator. Dowdell is currently a principal at HOK's Chicago office, and she served as the 2019-2020 national president of the National Organization of Minority Architects (NOMA). On June 15, 2022, Dowdell was elected as first vice-president and president-elect of the American Institute of Architects. She will be the 100th president of the American Institute of Architects and the first Black woman to serve in the role.

Early life and education 
Dowdell grew up in Detroit. Dowdell received a Bachelor of Architecture from Cornell University in 2006 and her Master in Public Administration from Harvard University in 2015.

Career 
When at Cornell in 2005, Dowdell co-founded the Social Economic Environmental Design (SEED) Network. After Cornell, Dowdell worked at HOK's New York office in 2008 before transitioning to focus on real estate in 2011.

After graduating from Harvard University in 2015, Dowdell worked for Detroit’s Housing and Revitalization Department and in 2016 transitioned to working with Century Partners on equitable revitalization of the city's vacant lots. Between 2016 and 2019, Dowdell taught architecture and urban planning at the University of Michigan.

As a principal at HOK, Dowdell launched the HOK IMPACT program and co-chairs the Diversity Advisory across all of HOK's global offices.

Awards and honors 

 Elected to Cornell University Board of Trustees, 2022
 AIA Young Architects Award, 2020
Women in Architecture Design Leadership - Activist Award, 2020
 19th Annual Dunlop Lecturer at the Harvard Graduate School of Design, 2019
 Next City Vanguard honoree for rising urban leaders, 2013 
 Crain’s Detroit Business “40 Under 40” honoree, 2005

Notable speaking events 

 World Build Podcast: CSR, environmental stewardship, equity and inclusion, June 7, 2021
TEDxDetroit : Home run Detroit November 2017

References 

African-American architects
American women architects
Cornell University College of Architecture, Art, and Planning alumni
Harvard Kennedy School alumni
Year of birth missing (living people)
Living people
University of Michigan faculty
American women academics
21st-century African-American people
Architects from Detroit
Women architects
21st-century African-American women